Fritz Bauer (23 June 1906 – 19 September 1992) was a German coxswain who competed in the 1928 Summer Olympics, in the 1932 Summer Olympics, and in the 1936 Summer Olympics.

In 1928 he coxed the German boat which finished fifth after being eliminated in the quarter-finals of the eight event. Four years later he was again the coxswain of the German boat which was eliminated in the repechage of the eight event. In 1936 he won the gold medal as coxswain of the German boat in the coxed four competition.

References

External links
Fritz Bauer's profile at databaseOlympics.com

1906 births
1992 deaths
Coxswains (rowing)
Olympic rowers of Germany
Rowers at the 1928 Summer Olympics
Rowers at the 1932 Summer Olympics
Rowers at the 1936 Summer Olympics
Olympic gold medalists for Germany
Olympic medalists in rowing
German male rowers
Medalists at the 1936 Summer Olympics
European Rowing Championships medalists